Lintgen is a commune and small town in central Luxembourg, in the canton of Mersch. It is situated on the river Alzette.

, the town of Lintgen, which lies in the west of the commune, has a population of 1,686. The number of inhabitants keeps on increasing, therefore ten years later, in 2015 there are approximately 2,798 people living in Lintgen. Another town within the commune is Gosseldange.

Population

References

External links
 

 
Communes in Mersch (canton)
Towns in Luxembourg